Yamasee, Yemassee or Yamassee could refer to:

Yamasee, an extinct Native American tribe of the Southern United States
Yamasee War (1715–1717), a conflict fought in South Carolina between British settlers and the Yamasee and other allied Native American peoples
Yemassee, South Carolina, a town in Lowcountry South Carolina in the United States
The Yemassee, an 1835 historical novel by Southern American writer William Gilmore Simms
Yemassee, the official literary journal of the University of South Carolina
Yamassee Native American Moors of the Creek Nation, another name for the black supremacist group Nuwaubian Nation associated with Dwight York